Leonard Jimmie Savage (born Leonard Ogashevitz; 20 November 1917 – 1 November 1971) was an American mathematician and statistician. Economist Milton Friedman said Savage was "one of the few people I have met whom I would unhesitatingly call a genius."

Education and career 
Savage was born and grew up in Detroit. He studied at Wayne State University in Detroit before transferring to University of Michigan, where he first majored in chemical engineering, then switched to mathematics, graduating in 1938 with a Bachelor's degree. He continued at the University of Michigan with a PhD on differential geometry in 1941 under the supervision of Sumner Byron Myers. Savage subsequently worked at the Institute for Advanced Study in Princeton, New Jersey, the University of Chicago, the University of Michigan, Yale University, and the Statistical Research Group at Columbia University.  Though his thesis advisor was Sumner Myers, he also credited Milton Friedman and W. Allen Wallis as statistical mentors.

During World War II, Savage served as chief "statistical" assistant to John von Neumann, the mathematician credited with describing the principles upon which electronic computers should be based.  Later he was one of the participants in the Macy conferences on cybernetics.

Research and contributions 
His most noted work was the 1954 book The Foundations of Statistics, in which he put forward a theory of subjective and personal probability and statistics which forms one of the strands underlying Bayesian statistics and has applications to game theory.

One of Savage's indirect contributions was his discovery of the work of Louis Bachelier on stochastic models for asset prices and the mathematical theory of option pricing. Savage brought the work of Bachelier to the attention of Paul Samuelson. It was from Samuelson's subsequent writing that "random walk" (and subsequently Brownian motion) became fundamental to mathematical finance.

In 1951 he introduced the minimax regret criterion used in decision theory. The Hewitt–Savage zero–one law and Friedman–Savage utility function are (in part) named after him, as is the Savage Award given annually by the International Society for Bayesian Analysis for the best dissertations in Bayesian analysis.

See also
Loss function
Friedman–Savage utility function

Notes

External links

 Leonard Jimmie Savage papers (MS 695). Manuscripts and Archives, Yale University Library. 

1917 births
1971 deaths
20th-century American mathematicians
American statisticians
Bayesian statisticians
University of Michigan alumni
Princeton University faculty
University of Chicago faculty
Columbia University faculty
University of Michigan faculty
Presidents of the Institute of Mathematical Statistics
Bayesian econometricians
20th-century  American economists
Mathematical statisticians